This is a list of current members of the Brussels Parliament, arranged alphabetically. The Parliament counts 89 members, 17 of which are reserved for the Dutch-language group. Of the remaining 72 French-speaking members, 19 are also member of the Parliament of the French Community.

Composition (2011–)
The elections took place in 2009.

List of members

Sources

  - Only available in French and Dutch.

List
2009 in Belgium
2010s in Belgium